Denby Dale is a civil parish in the metropolitan borough of Kirklees, West Yorkshire, England.  It contains 82 listed buildings that are recorded in the National Heritage List for England.  Of these, one is listed at Grade I, the highest of the three grades, three are at Grade II*, the middle grade, and the others are at Grade II, the lowest grade.  The parish contains the villages of Denby Dale, Clayton West, Lower Cumberworth, Upper Cumberworth, Lower Denby, Upper Denby, Emley, Scissett, and Skelmanthorpe, and is otherwise rural.  Most of the listed buildings are houses and cottages, farmhouses and farm buildings, and churches and chapels with associated structures.  The other listed buildings include the base of a market cross, bridges, including a packhorse bridge, mill buildings, a milestone and mileposts, a set of stocks, a railway viaduct, and a television transmitting mast.


Key

Buildings

References

Citations

Sources

Lists of listed buildings in West Yorkshire